Don't Make Me Think is a book by Steve Krug about human–computer interaction and web usability. The book's premise is that a good software program or web site should let users accomplish their intended tasks as easily and directly as possible. Krug points out that people are good at satisficing, or taking the first available solution to their problem, so design should take advantage of this. He frequently cites Amazon.com as an example of a well-designed web site that manages to allow high-quality interaction, even though the web site gets bigger and more complex every day.

The book is intended to exemplify brevity and focus. The goal, according to the book's introduction, was to make a text that could be read by an executive on a two-hour airplane flight.

Originally published in 2000, the book was revised in 2005 and 2013 and has sold more than 300,000 copies.

In 2010, the author published a sequel, Rocket Surgery Made Easy, which explains how anyone working on a web site, mobile app, or desktop software can do their own usability testing to ensure that what they're building will be usable.

The book has been referenced in college courses and online courses on usability.

References

External links 
Book description on author's website, www.sensible.com

Human–computer interaction
2000 non-fiction books